Melissa Pagnotta (born September 22, 1988) is a Canadian taekwondo fighter. Pagnotta participated at the 2016 Summer Olympics in Rio de Janeiro, becoming the first Ontario representative in that sport. She qualified to the 2016 Olympics by winning Silver at the Pan Am Olympic Qualification event in Aguascalientes Mexico. Pagnotta saw success at the 2011 Pan American Games in Guadalajara where she won gold in the lightweight (under 67 kg) class. She won a silver at the 2015 World Grand Prix in Moscow losing a close match to Korea in sudden death. She has won the Pan Am Championships 4x (2005,2008, 2010 and 2014) and Commonwealth Championships 3x (2008,2014 and 2017). She is coached by Canadian National team coach Edward Fong in Richmond Hill, Ontario.

Results 
2021 Pan American Championships - Bronze (Mexico)

2020 US Open - Bronze

2019 Grand Prix Final (Moscow) - Top 16

2019 French Open - Gold

2019 World Taekwondo Presidents Cup (Pan Am) - Gold

2019 Canada Open - Gold (MVP)

2019 Grand Prix (Chiba) - Top 32

2019 Grand Prix (Rome) - Top 32

2019 Pan Am Open - Silver

2019 World Championships - 9th

2019 US Open - Silver

2018 Grand Prix Final (Fujairah) - Top 16

2018 Grand Prix 4 (Manchester) - Top 16

2018 World Taekwondo Presidents Cup (Pan Am) - Gold (MVP)

2018 Canada Open - Silver

2018 Pan Am Championships - Bronze

2018 Grand Prix 1 (Rome) - Top 32

2018 US Open - Silver

2017 World Taekwondo Presidents Cup (Pan Am) - Bronze

2017 Canada Open - Gold

2017 Commonwealth Championships - Gold

2017 Costa Rica Open - Silver

2017 World Championships - Top 8

2016 World Taekwondo Presidents Cup (Pan Am) - Gold

2016 Grand Prix Final - Top 8

2016 Olympic Games - Top 8

2016 Pan Am Open - Gold

2016 Pan Am Olympic Qualifier – Top 2

2016 Mexico Open – Gold

2016 German Open - Bronze

2016 Spain Open - Gold

2015 Pan Am Open- Gold

2015 Grand Prix 1 – Silver

2015 Grand Prix 2 – Top 16

2015 Grand Prix 3 – Top 32

2015 World Championships – Top 16

2015 Croatia Open – Top 8

2015 Morocco Open - Gold

2015 Canada Open - Gold

2015 US Open - Bronze

2014 Pan Am Open- Bronze

2014 Turkish Open- Top 8

2014 Paris Open - Silver

2014 Commonwealth Championships - Gold

2014 Grand Prix 3- Top 32

2014 Pan Am Championships - Gold

2014 Mexico Open - Silver

2014 Grand Prix 2- Top 32

2014 Grand Prix 1- Top 32

2014 US Open - Top 8

2014 Canada Open - Silver

2013 US Open - Silver

2013 Grand Prix Finals - Top 16

2013 Canada Open - Top 8

2012 Korea Open - Bronze

2012 Pan Am Championships - Top 8

2012 Canada Open - Top 8

2011 World Championships - Top 64

2011 Pan Am Games - Gold

2011 Korea Open - Bronze

2011 US Open - Gold

2010 Pan Am Championships - Gold

2010 Dutch Open - Top 8

2010 US Open - Gold

2010 Germany Open - Bronze

2009 US Open - Gold

2009 Korea Open - Top 8

2008 Commonwealth Championships - Gold

2008 Pan Am Championships - Gold - MVP

2007 World Championships - Top 32

2005 Jr Pan Am Championships - Gold

2005 Paris Open - Bronze

2004 Jr World Championships - Top 8

2003 Jr Pan Am Championships -Silver

2002 Jr World Championships - Top 64

Senior:
2022 Canadian National - Gold

2019 Canadian National - Gold

2018 Canadian National - Gold (MVP)

2017 Canadian National - Gold

2015 Canadian National - Gold

2014 Canadian National - Gold

2013 Canadian National - Gold

2012 Olympic Carding Game- Silver

2012 Canadian National - Gold

2011 Canadian National Team Trials - Gold

2011 Olympic Carding Game- Gold

2011 Canadian National - Gold

2010 Canadian National Team Trials - Gold

2010 Olympic Carding Game- Gold

2010 Canadian National - Gold

2009 Olympic Carding Game- Gold

2009 Canadian National Team Trials - Silver

2009 Canadian National - Gold

2008 Olympic Carding Game- Silver

2008 Canadian National Team Trials - Gold

2008 Canadian National - Gold - MVP

2007 Olympic Carding Game- Silver

2007 Canadian National Team Trials - Gold

2007 Canadian National - Gold

2006 Olympic Carding Game- Silver

2006 Canadian National - Gold

2005 Olympic Carding Game- Silver

2005 Canadian National - Bronze

2004 Olympic Carding Game- Gold

2004 Canadian National - Gold

References

External links
 

1988 births
Living people
Sportspeople from North York
Canadian female taekwondo practitioners
Taekwondo practitioners at the 2011 Pan American Games
Pan American Games gold medalists for Canada
Taekwondo practitioners at the 2016 Summer Olympics
Pan American Games medalists in taekwondo
Olympic taekwondo practitioners of Canada
Medalists at the 2011 Pan American Games
21st-century Canadian women